The Boy Named If is the 32nd studio album by English singer-songwriter Elvis Costello and The Imposters. The album was released on 14 January 2022 by EMI Records and Capitol Records.

The Boy Named If received critical acclaim and was nominated for Best Rock Album at the 65th Annual Grammy Awards.

Content 

The album's first single, "Magnificent Hurt" was released on October 27, 2021. Stereogum's Tom Breihan described the track as a "a straight-up rocker" and compared it to his late 70s work.

Critical reception

The Boy Named If received generally positive reviews from critics. At Metacritic, which assigns a normalised rating out of 100 to reviews from critics, the album received an average score of 83, which indicates "universal acclaim", based on 14 reviews. Stephen Thomas Erlewine wrote that The Boy Named If was Costello's "purest doses of rock and roll since maybe Blood & Chocolate (1986)".

Track listing

Personnel
Musicians
 Elvis Costello – vocals, guitar (all tracks); piano (6)
 Davey Faragher – additional vocals, bass (all tracks); upright bass (12)
 Pete Thomas – drums, percussion
 Steve Nieve – keyboards, piano
 Sebastian Krys – background vocals (3, 4)
 Nicole Atkins – vocals (8)

Technical
 Elvis Costello – production
 Sebastian Krys – production, mixing, engineering
 Brian Lucey – mastering
 Daniel Galindo – engineering
 Ron Taylor – engineering
 Dex Green – recording (8)

Charts

References

External links
 

2022 albums
Elvis Costello albums
EMI Records albums
Capitol Records albums